Joaquín Arbe (born 25 August 1990) is an Argentine long-distance runner. In 2020, he competed in the men's race at the 2020 World Athletics Half Marathon Championships held in Gdynia, Poland.

He represented Argentina at the 2020 Summer Olympics in Tokyo, Japan in the men's marathon.

References

External links 
 

Living people
1990 births
Argentine male middle-distance runners
Argentine male long-distance runners
Argentine male marathon runners
Argentine male steeplechase runners
Athletes (track and field) at the 2020 Summer Olympics
Olympic athletes of Argentina
Olympic male marathon runners
People from Esquel